Keban District is a district of Elazığ Province of Turkey. Its seat is the town Keban. Its area is 641 km2, and its population is 6,210 (2021). In 1927,  of the population in the district spoke Kurdish as their mother tongue, while that number rose to 39% in 1968.

Composition
There is 1 municipality in Keban District:
Keban

There are 30 villages in Keban District:

 Akçatepe
 Akgömlek
 Altınkürek
 Altıyaka
 Aşağıçakmak
 Aslankaşı
 Bademli
 Bahçeli
 Bayındır
 Beydeğirmeni
 Bölükçalı
 Büklümlü
 Çalık
 Çevrekaya
 Denizli
 Dürümlü
 Gökbelen
 Göldere
 Güneytepe
 Kopuzlu
 Koyunuşağı
 Kurşunkaya
 Kuşçu
 Nimri
 Örenyaka
 Sağdıçlar
 Taşkesen
 Topkıran
 Üçpınar
 Ulupınar

References

Sources

Districts of Elazığ Province